The Entertainment System is Down is an upcoming film directed by Ruben Östlund and starring Woody Harrelson.

Plot 
Quite soon after a take-off on an ordinary flight, the crew has to inform the passengers that the entertainment system on the plane has gone offline. The passengers are now doomed on a 15-hours flight without any entertainment.

References

Upcoming films